Ilya Antonovich Moseychuk (born 19 March 2000) is a Russian football player who plays for FC Kuban Krasnodar on loan from FC Akhmat Grozny.

Club career
He made his debut in the Russian Football National League for FC Tekstilshchik Ivanovo on 8 August 2020 in a game against FC SKA-Khabarovsk, he substituted Aleksandr Shlyonkin in the 86th minute.

On 13 July 2022, Moseychuk joined FC Kuban Krasnodar on a season-long loan.

References

External links
 
 Profile by Russian Football National League
 

2000 births
Sportspeople from Magadan Oblast
Living people
Russian footballers
Association football midfielders
FC Akhmat Grozny players
FC Tekstilshchik Ivanovo players
FC Urozhay Krasnodar players
Russian First League players